Roger Milhau (born 29 March 1955) is a retired French middle-distance runner who competed primarily in the 800 metres.

He was born in Istres. He won the bronze medal at the 1978 European Indoor Championships and the gold medal at the 1980 European Indoor Championships. He reached the semi-finals at the 1978 European Championships and the 1980 Olympic Games.

He became French champion in 1978, 1979 and 1980; and French indoor champion in 1978, 1979 and 1982.

His personal best time was 1:45.98 minutes, achieved in July 1980 in Saint-Maur.

References

1955 births
Living people
People from Istres
French male middle-distance runners
Athletes (track and field) at the 1980 Summer Olympics
Olympic athletes of France
Sportspeople from Bouches-du-Rhône